Walter Quiroz (born November 13, 1972 in San Isidro, Buenos Aires, Argentina) is an Argentine theatre, television and film actor.

Roles by chronology

1989 - Relief: 5th year - s / d - Telenovela - s / d.
1992 - Fiesta and anger of being young - Telenovela - s / d.
1992 - The Journey - Movie - Martin.
1992 - Perfume de Gardenia - Movie - Quim.
1996 - Heart lit - Movie - John (Young).
1997 - are or become - Telenovela - s / d.
1997 - The impostor - Telenovela - Juan Medina.
2000 - Eternal Summer - Telenovela - Father Paul Valentini.
2001 - PH - Telenovela - Augustine.
2001 - Animalada - Movie - Gaston.
2002 - Franco Buenaventura, the teacher - Telenovela - Martin Ledesma.
2003 - Son Amores - Telenovela - Caesar.
2004 - No Code - Mini series - James Nielsen (special performance).
2004 - Pensioners - Telenovela - Mariano.
2005 - Criminal - Miniseries - Fernando Di Pietro.
2005 - Death of Danton - Theatre - s / d.
2006 - no time for - Telenovela - Paul.
2008 - In bed - Theatre - s / d.
2008 - Donne assassine - Telenovela - s / d.
2008 - White lies - Movie - Paul.
2008 - The Successful Pells (Argentina) - Telenovela - Diego Plans.
2010 - The Anatomist - Theatre - s / d.
2011 - Spectrum - Theatre - s / d.

External links
 

1972 births
Living people
Argentine male stage actors
Argentine male television actors
Argentine male film actors
Argentine LGBT actors
Male actors from Buenos Aires